Edward William McFarland (August 3, 1874 – November 28, 1959), born in Cleveland, Ohio, was a catcher for the Cleveland Spiders (1893), St. Louis Browns (1896–97), Philadelphia Phillies (1897–1901), Chicago White Sox (1902–07) and Boston Red Sox (1908). He helped the White Sox win the 1906 World Series.

In 12 seasons McFarland played in 894 Games and had 3,007 At Bats, 398 Runs, 826 Hits, 146 Doubles, 49 Triples, 13 Home Runs, 383 RBI, 65 Stolen Bases, 254 Walks, .275 Batting Average, .335 On-base percentage, .369 Slugging Percentage and 1,109 Total Bases.

He died at age 85 in his hometown from injuries resulting from an accidental fall.

Sources

1874 births
1959 deaths
Major League Baseball catchers
Cleveland Spiders players
St. Louis Browns (NL) players
Philadelphia Phillies players
Chicago White Sox players
Boston Red Sox players
Akron Summits players
Toledo White Stockings players
Indianapolis Hoosiers (minor league) players
Indianapolis Indians players
Baseball players from Cleveland
Accidental deaths from falls
Accidental deaths in Ohio